Siphonaria compressa is a species of small, air-breathing sea snail. It is a pulmonate limpet, a gastropod in the Siphonariidae family.

Distribution 
It is endemic to South Africa.

A further site for this false limpet was discovered in 2004 in the Knysna River estuary (S34 03:E23 03) South Africa by Dr B. R. Allanson (the original describer of the species).

Description 
The length of the shell is 4-4.5 mm. It is the smallest species of Siphonariidae.

Ecology 
This small false limpet lives on the leaves of the marine plant, eelgrass.

References

Siphonariidae
Gastropods described in 1958
Taxonomy articles created by Polbot